La Spezia (or , ;  in the local Spezzino dialect) is the capital city of the province of La Spezia and is located at the head of the Gulf of La Spezia in the southern part of the Liguria region of Italy.

La Spezia is the second-largest city in the Liguria region, after Genoa. Located roughly midway between Genoa and Pisa, on the Ligurian Sea, it is one of the main Italian military and commercial harbours and a major Italian Navy base. A popular seaside resort, it is also a significant railway junction, and is notable for its museums, for the Palio del Golfo rowing race, and for railway and boat links with the Cinque Terre.

History 

La Spezia and its province have been settled since prehistoric times. In Roman times the most important centre was Luni, not far from Sarzana. As the capital of the short-lived Niccolò Fieschi Signoria in the period between 1256 and 1273, La Spezia was inevitably linked with Genoese vicissitudes. After the fall of the Republic of Genoa, an independent state until 1797, La Spezia grew, developed and changed, though along lines similar to Liguria's capital Genoa. This Ligurian influence can still be seen in the urban layout as well as in the types of buildings and decorations. This is notable in the carrugio, the narrow street that divides the Old Town into two. It is called Via del Prione, taking its name from the pietrone or large stone, in local dialect prione, where public announcements were once read out.

Walking landwards from the sea it is possible to see partly hidden, but still evident, traces of history: engraved stones, capitals, and portals in fourteenth century sandstone, double lancet windows vaguely reminiscent of the future renaissance style of mannerism, baroque pediments, and decorations similar to those adorning the portals of the palaces once belonging to the Doria family and the Princes of Massa.

La Spezia developed substantially after 1861 when the great naval arsenal there was commissioned by the Royal government. In September 1943, after the Italian capitulation to the Allies, it was the departure port for the Italian Navy when it was ordered to steam into British hands at Malta. The Germans arrived too late to stop the departure of the fleet. During the war Italian troopships also left from La Spezia, including the Kaiser Franz Josef, a trans-Atlantic liner launched in Trieste in 1911 for the Austrian Lloyd company, which Italy had confiscated in 1919. It was sunk in La Spezia harbour in 1944.

After the liberation, La Spezia became the point of departure for survivors from Nazi concentration camps. From the summer of 1945 to the spring of 1948 more than 23,000 Jewish displaced persons managed to leave Italy clandestinely for the Palestine Mandate. After lengthy vicissitudes, the ships Fede, Fenice, and Komemiut managed to evacuate everyone from the Golfo di La Spezia, to the extent that on Israeli maps, La Spezia is called Shaʿar Zion, in Hebrew “Gateway to Zion”.

Main sights

Churches 

 Cristo Re dei Secoli, modern cathedral, consecrated in 1975, designed by Adalberto Libera. 
 Abbey church of Santa Maria Assunta ("Our Lady of the Assumption", thirteenth century). It houses a considerable series of artworks, some of them originally from other suppressed religious institutes. They include an Incoronation of the Virgin by Andrea della Robbia, the Multiplication of Bread by Giovanni Battista Casoni and St. Bartholomew's Martyrdom by Luca Cambiaso. 
 Santi Giovanni e Agostino. It has a single nave with eighteenth and nineteenth century decorations. 
 Nostra Signora della Scorza. Built in 1900 in Piazza Brin, in the heart of what is now a working-class neighborhood, Quartiere Umbertino.
 Maria Ausiliatrice. Built in the second half of 20th century and administered by the order of Salesiani in the proletarian neighbourhood  "Canaletto".
 Nostra Signora del Pianto, a small church which hosts an image of the Blessed Virgin Mary that is believed to be the protagonist of a sorrowful event. Its feast occurs on Pentecost.

Museums 

 Ubaldo Formentini— Civic Museum in the Castle of San Giorgio
 Amedeo Lia Museum 
 Palazzina delle Arti and Museum of Seals
 Museum of Modern and Contemporary Art (CAMeC) 
 Diocesan Museum 
 Ethnographic Civic Museum 
 Technical Naval Museum
 National Transportation Museum

Others 

 Castle of San Giorgio, recently restored, probably originated from a watchtower. A first castle is known to have been built by Niccolò Fieschi in 1262. In 1273 it was destroyed by the  Genoese, and a new fortification, along with a new line of walls, was erected by the podesteria of La Spezia from 1371. Annexed to this, the Republic of Genoa added a new castle starting from 1607. 
 Public Gardens 
 Art Nouveau–style villas 
 Futurist mosaic by Prampolini inside the Post Office
 La Spezia is a point of departure for the villages of the Cinque Terre, either by train or boat. The boat also serves Lerici and Portovenere before turning into the open sea toward the Cinque Terre. The Cinque Terre villages are accessible by public transport,  from central railway station.

Climate 

La Spezia has a borderline humid subtropical (Cfa) and Mediterranean climate (Csa). The city enjoys hot summers, chilly damp winters and very changeable and rainy autumns and springs. The average temperatures of the coldest month (January) are  minimum and  maximum. In the hottest month (July) they are  minimum and  maximum. Snow is extremely uncommon. Heavy snowfalls are exceptional events: only in 1985 was a snowfall of more than   recorded.

Conversely, in summer, especially during sunny days, the temperature can easily exceed , and sometimes it reaches . Furthermore, the sensation of heat in summer is increased by the high humidity.

Because of its topography, the city is not exposed to winds from the north, which lap western Liguria, but to those from the southeast. These may bring heavy rain and they can reach , in rare cases causing the blocking of the port. 
The only northern wind reaching the city is the north-eastern Grecale, common during incursions of  Arctic air, when the cold air flowing over the warmer Tyrrhenian sea triggers the formation of low pressures, draining the colder and heavier air trapped in the Po Valley, behind the Apennine Mountains.

Government

People 

 Alessia Aquilani (born 1967), known as Alexia, singer 
 Giulio Cappelli (1911–1995), football player
 Toto Cutugno (born 1943), singer
 Leonardo D'Imporzano (born 1982), freediver and journalist
 Gian Paolo Dulbecco (born 1941), painter
 Rinaldo Fiumi (born 1923), football player
 Giancarlo Giannini (born 1942), actor 
 Ettore Gracis (1915–1992), conductor 
 Markus Hinterhäuser (born 1958), Austrian pianist and cultural manager
 Virginia Oldoini (1837–1899), countess of Castiglione 
 Eros Pagni (born 1939), actor 
 Gaetano Pesce (born 1939), architect designer 
 Arrigo Petacco (1929–2018), writer, historian and journalist
 Alessandro Petacchi (born 1974), cyclist
 Lorenzo Richelmy (born 1990), actor
 Gino Rossetti (1904–1992), football player
 Giacinto Scelsi (1905–1988), composer
 Alberto Sorrentino (1916–1994), actor
 Sauro Tomà (1925–2018), football player

Economy 

Today, La Spezia is the chief Italian naval base and arsenal, and the base for a navy navigation school. It is also a commercial port, with shipyards and industries producing machinery, metal products, and refined petroleum.

Transportation

Buses and Trolleybuses 

La Spezia's public transportation services are managed by ATC La Spezia, which owns urban, suburban and interurban bus routes; as well as the local trolleybus network and other services within the city.

Railway 

The main railway stations in the city are La Spezia Centrale railway station, Migliarina railway station, and Ca' di Boschetti.

Education 

Since 2002, a university named G. Marconi has had its headquarters in La Spezia.

The Distretto Ligure delle Tecnologie Marine (DLTM) is a research hub in La Spezia, Italy, focused on blue economy. It's a partnership of more than 20 entities including Fincantieri, Leonardo S.p.A., Intermarine, Rina Service, Consorzio Tecnomar, Autorità portuale, CNR, Camera di Commercio and University of Genoa and one of the five of innovation and research hub in Liguria. 

Both the "G. Marconi" pole and the DLTM are hosted in the old building of the Bruno Falcomatà hospital since December 2019.

Sports 

In 2020, the local football club, Spezia Calcio, was promoted to the Serie A for the first time in their history.

International relations 

La Spezia is twinned with:

  Toulon, France 
  Bayreuth, Germany
  Vallejo, USA

See also 

 La Spezia–Rimini Line 
 Spezia Calcio 1906 
 Stadio Alberto Picco

References

Sources

External links 

 
 Satellite picture by Google Maps 
 A Path to Lunch—Archive and blog centered in Lunigiana/La Spezia. Walks, buses, food, history
 

 
Coastal towns in Liguria
Italian Riviera
Spezia
Liguria
Territories of the Republic of Genoa